Aleksander Kreek (21 July 1914 – 19 August 1977) was an Estonian track and field athlete who specialised in the shot put. He was the 1938 European champion in the shot put – one of only two Estonian men to achieve the feat, alongside Arnold Viiding. He was twice a medallist at the International University Games (1937 and 1939).

He was a four-time national shot put champion, and also a one-time discus throw champion.

Career
Born in Lihula, Lääne County, he reached international class in the mid-1930s, competing in the sport while at military school. After receiving his first international call-up in 1936, he had his first successes in the 1937 season. He won the gold medal at the 1937 International University Games, retaining the title for Estonia which Arnold Viiding had won two years previously. That year, he also won the first of his four Estonian national titles in the shot put.

In his career he would go on to break this mark twice more: in 1939 he threw  before reaching a lifetime best distance of  that same year. Again he was following on from his compatriot Arnold Viiding, who was the champion at the inaugural 1934 edition. Despite this early success, Kreek and Viiding remain the only Estonians to have won the European shot put title. For his achievement he was given the Order of the White Star (III class), in recognition of his services to Estonia through sport.

The third and final major international medal of his career was a silver medal at the 1939 International University Games. Kreek gave a strong performance, reaching , but was outdone by Germany's Gerhard Stöck, who was the reigning Olympic javelin throw champion. Kreek also won the Estonian discus throw title in 1939.

He continued to compete nationally after that, winning his remaining national shot put titles, but his performance declined and he did not pass sixteen metres after 1940.

Away from the track, Kreek worked for Estonia's National Bureau of Statistics from 1936 to 1938, the Bank of Estonia from 1938 to 1940, then as a police officer for the occupation forces of Nazi Germany in the mid-1940s. He left Estonia for Sweden as a refugee of the 1944 Soviet invasion of Estonia. Kreek later emigrated to Canada in the early 1950s and settled down to family life there. He died in Toronto in 1977. His grandson, Adam Kreek, became an international class rower for Canada and was a gold medallist at the 2008 Summer Olympics.

References

1914 births
1977 deaths
People from Lääneranna Parish
People from the Governorate of Estonia
Estonian male shot putters
Estonian emigrants to Canada
Estonian World War II refugees
European Athletics Championships medalists
Recipients of the Order of the White Star, 3rd Class